Teenage Mutant Ninja Turtles: The Cowabunga Collection is a compilation of video games developed by Digital Eclipse and published by Konami. It features thirteen Teenage Mutant Ninja Turtles video games developed by Konami between 1989 and 1994. It was released for Nintendo Switch, PlayStation 4, PlayStation 5,  Windows via Steam, Xbox One and Xbox Series X/S in August 2022.

Content 
The Cowabunga Collection compiles thirteen Teenage Mutant Ninja Turtles games developed by Konami between 1989 and 1994, listed below.

The Cowabunga Collection adds save states, rewind functions, button mapping, as well as online capabilities in certain games and local co-op in all games where it was originally intended. It also features an in-game museum that offers previously unseen development art, sketches and game design material for the titles. Almost every game includes both the Western and Japanese versions, with the exceptions being the arcade version of Turtles in Time and the NES version of Tournament Fighters, which did not have Japanese versions.

Development and release 
The compilation was developed by Digital Eclipse, who had previously worked on other retro collections, such as The Disney Afternoon Collection and Street Fighter 30th Anniversary Collection.

The Cowabunga Collection was announced as part of the PlayStation State of Play event on March 9, 2022. The game was also featured at San Diego Comic-Con 2022. It was released for the Nintendo Switch, PlayStation 4, PlayStation 5, Windows, Xbox One and Xbox Series X/S on August 30, 2022. A limited edition physical version of the game was also released, containing a cloth poster, an acrylic diorama, an enamel pin set, 12 Tournament Fighters cards, and a 180-page artbook. The box art and cloth poster were designed by Teenage Mutant Ninja Turtles co-creator Kevin Eastman.

Reception 

Teenage Mutant Ninja Turtles: The Cowabunga Collection received "generally favorable" reviews, according to the review aggregator Metacritic.

References

External links

2022 video games
Side-scrolling beat 'em ups
Nintendo Switch games
Windows games
Video games based on Teenage Mutant Ninja Turtles
Video games developed in the United States
Video games featuring female protagonists
Video games set in the United States
Video games set in New York City
Multiplayer and single-player video games
Retro-style video games
Konami games
PlayStation 4 games
PlayStation 5 games
Xbox One games
Xbox Series X and Series S games
Konami video game compilations
Digital Eclipse games